Miran Györek (13 April 1952 – 23 November 2021) was a Slovenian politician. A member of the Slovenian National Party, he served in the National Assembly from 2008 to 2011.

References

1952 births
2021 deaths
Members of the National Assembly (Slovenia)
Slovenian National Party politicians
People from Murska Sobota